George Julius Gulack  (May 12, 1905 – July 27, 1987) was an American gymnast and Olympic champion. He competed at the 1932 Summer Olympics in Los Angeles where he received a gold medal on the rings.

In 1984, he was inducted into the International Jewish Sports Hall of Fame. Gulack died in July 1987 at the age of 82.

See also

List of select Jewish gymnasts

References

External links

 

1905 births
1987 deaths
American male artistic gymnasts
Gymnasts at the 1932 Summer Olympics
Olympic gold medalists for the United States in gymnastics
Sportspeople from Riga
Medalists at the 1932 Summer Olympics
International Jewish Sports Hall of Fame inductees
20th-century American people